Jonathan "Jon" D. Zlotnik (born May 7, 1990) is an American politician, who has served as a member of the Massachusetts House of Representatives since 2013.

Early years
Born to Michael and Mary Ann, Zlotnik graduated from Gardner High School in 2008 and then from the University of Massachusetts Lowell with a Bachelor of Arts in History in 2012. His thesis was titled "Actors at the End of a Bad Play: The Struggle for Polish Independence, 1796-1945."

Political career
Zlotnik gained initial political experience as a summer aide in 2007 and 2008 for Robert Rice.

In 2012, Zlotnik launched a campaign for the 2nd Worcester seat in the Massachusetts House of Representatives, while he was still a senior in college. Zlotnik ultimately defeated Republican nominee, Richard M. Bastien, in the election, and deferred plans to study at Suffolk University Law School and join the United States Navy. He now serves on the Joint Committee on Education.

In 2020, Zlotnik endorsed Joe Biden and his presidential campaign, as well as Ed Markey for the 2020 Senate election in Massachusetts. In 2022, Zlotnik endorsed Lori Trahan for a seat in the House of Representatives elections in Massachusetts.

References

External links

1990 births
Living people
People from Gardner, Massachusetts
University of Massachusetts Lowell alumni
21st-century American politicians
Democratic Party members of the Massachusetts House of Representatives